Tarazuea is a census village in the Sopore tehsil of Baramulla district, Jammu & Kashmir, India. As per the 2011 Census of India, Tarazuea has a total population of 6,910 people including 3,504 males and 3,406 with a literacy rate of 53.01%.

References 

Villages in Baramulla district